Mark Corrigan (born 1960 in Kinnitty, County Offaly) is a retired Irish sportsperson.  He played hurling with his local club Kinnitty and was a member of the Offaly senior inter-county team from 1980 until 1990.  Corrigan was a key member of the Offaly team that won All-Ireland titles in 1981 and 1985.

References

1960 births
Living people
Kinnitty hurlers
Offaly inter-county hurlers
All-Ireland Senior Hurling Championship winners